Stoffel Vandoorne (born 26 March 1992) is a Belgian professional racing driver who is currently racing for DS Penske in Formula E. He had previously competed in Formula One for McLaren from 2016 to 2018. He is currently a test driver for the Aston Martin Aramco Cognizant Formula One Team and Oracle Red Bull Racing. He was champion of the 2015 GP2 Series and the 2021–22 Formula E World Championship. He currently resides in both Monte Carlo (Monaco) and Roeselare (Belgium).

Early life 
Stoffel Vandoorne was born in Kortrijk, West Flanders. Vandoorne was introduced to motorsport at the age of six during a visit to the kart track of World Karts in Kortrijk in Flanders, Belgium, with his father. Vandoorne started karting after the owner of the track gave him a mini-kart.

Early career

Karting 
Initially, lack of funding restricted Vandoorne to race 3 to 4 races per year. By age 16 he was Belgian KF2 Champion. In 2009 he finished as runner-up in the CIK-FIA World Cup in the KF2 category. The same year he won the 'steering wheel' competition held by the Royal Automobile Club of Belgium. The prize money of 45,000 euros helped him start his car racing career in F4 Eurocup 1.6.

Formula Renault

2010 

In 2010, Vandoorne moved up to single-seater racing, joining the F4 Eurocup 1.6 series. He went on to win the series on his first attempt, finishing the season with six wins and three further podium finishes. The prize from winning the series helped him to move up to the Eurocup Formula Renault 2.0 the following year. He also earned a place in the FIA Driver Academy.

2011 
In 2011, he graduated to competing in the Eurocup Formula Renault 2.0 with Kurt Mollekens' KTR team. He finished fifth overall, with one podium at the Hungaroring and another eight-point-scoring finishes throughout the season. He also participated in Formula Renault 2.0 Northern European Cup, where he finished third in the series' standings with eight podiums.

2012 
For the 2012 season Vandoorne remained in the Eurocup, but left KTR to join Josef Kaufmann Racing. He won the championship by ten points after a tight battle between himself and Red Bull-backed Daniil Kvyat. Between them they won 11 of the 14 races and finished over 100 points ahead of their nearest challenger. Vandoorne finished the season with four wins and six podiums to his name. He also contested selected events in the Northern European Cup, where he won five of the seven races that he started, and finished on the podium in a sixth race.

2013 
In 2013, Vandoorne raced in Formula Renault 3.5, where he replaced 2012 champion Robin Frijns at Fortec Motorsport. He finished runner-up to Kevin Magnussen with four wins and 10 podiums, including a victory at his home track of Spa-Francorchamps.

GP2 Series

2014 

In January 2014, it was confirmed that Vandoorne would make his debut in GP2, racing with ART. In the opening race at Bahrain, Vandoorne claimed his first victory of the season in the feature race. He followed this up with four consecutive pole positions, three more wins at the Hungaroring, Monza and Yas Marina and six additional podiums. Despite being a rookie, he finished runner-up to 2014 champion Jolyon Palmer.

2015 
Vandoorne reunited with ART for 2015, as well as was considered the main title contender. He was partnered by 2014 Japanese Formula Three champion Nobuharu Matsushita. After five feature race wins, twelve podiums and four pole positions, Vandoorne took the title in Sochi, 108 points over his nearest rival Alexander Rossi.

Vandoorne holds the record for all-time most wins, most feature race wins, most pole positions and most consecutive pole positions, most podiums, most podiums in a season, most points and most points in a single season in GP2 history, with the series being rebranded as the FIA Formula 2 Championship at the end of the following year.

Super Formula 
On 12 February 2016, it was announced that Vandoorne would race a Honda in Super Formula for Dandelion Racing. He finished fourth overall, the highest ranking among Honda engine users, with two wins and one pole position at Fuji Speedway in wet conditions throughout the season.

Formula One career 
In February 2013, Vandoorne joined McLaren's Young Driver Programme, under the tutelage of his then manager Richard Goddard, in collaboration with the team's sporting director Sam Michael and its head of communications Matt Bishop, to whom Vandoorne had been introduced in 2011 by Alex Wurz.

In January 2014, he was announced as a third driver for McLaren F1 also taking up driving duties in the GP2 Series for ART Grand Prix.

McLaren (2016–2018, 2020–2022)

2016 season 

On 31 March 2016, it was announced Vandoorne would be replacing regular driver Fernando Alonso at the Bahrain Grand Prix after the Spaniard was ruled unfit to drive following a major accident in the previous round. After qualifying 12th ahead of Jenson Button, Vandoorne finished 10th and became the first reserve driver to score points on debut since Sebastian Vettel at the 2007 United States Grand Prix.

On 3 September 2016, ahead of the Italian Grand Prix, it was announced by McLaren that Jenson Button would not be racing in 2017, and that Vandoorne would be replacing him to partner Alonso for the  season.

2017 season 

In his debut full season at McLaren, Vandoorne established himself as a considerable rookie next to veteran F1 Champion, Fernando Alonso. With the uncompetitive McLaren, Vandoorne racked up 13 points compared to Alonso's 17. The key issues lay in the reliability and performance of the car which resulted in 1 DNS and 5 DNFs throughout the 20 race season. Nevertheless, he managed to crack into the top 10 in Hungary, Malaysia and Singapore.

On 23 August 2017, it was announced that Vandoorne would be retained for the  season.

2018 season 

In the new McLaren Renault partnership, Vandoorne enjoyed a good start to the season with 3 points finishes in the first 4 races. However, as the season progressed, he struggled to maintain this momentum which left him with 8 points by the Japanese Grand Prix. Moreover, the lack of a competitive package in the McLaren resulted in a long drought in points finishes between the 2018 Azerbaijan Grand Prix and the 2018 Mexican Grand Prix. Vandoorne ended the season in 16th ahead of 4 other drivers in the drivers' championship. However, the last few Grands Prix saw Vandoorne in some impressive battles, particularly in the Abu Dhabi Grand Prix with Esteban Ocon and Romain Grosjean, which led him to finish 8th on the Formula 1 Power Rankings.

It was announced on 3 September 2018 that Vandoorne would leave McLaren at the end of the 2018 season.

Reserve driver (2020–2022)
Vandoorne was the simulator driver for the McLaren team in 2020 and was named as one of the team's reserve drivers in 2021, but in 2022 was not chosen as the driver for the final pre-season test Bahrain after Daniel Ricciardo tested positive for COVID-19.

Mercedes (2019–2022) 

Vandoorne was the simulator driver for the Mercedes team in 2019 and was named as one of the team's reserve drivers in 2020, but in the end was not chosen as the driver for the 2020 Sakhir Grand Prix after Hamilton tested positive for COVID-19. Vandoorne drove for Mercedes in the season-ending 2020 Abu Dhabi Young Drivers Test alongside Formula E teammate Nyck de Vries.

Vandoorne was also made available as reserve driver for Racing Point in 2020 and McLaren from 2020 to 2022, as part of an agreement between Mercedes and both teams.

Aston Martin (2023–) 
Vandoorne is announced to be joining Aston Martin for the 2023 Formula One World Championship as a reserve and simulator driver, sharing duties with 2022 Formula 2 champion Felipe Drugovich. Additionally, he was also made a reserve driver for McLaren.

Formula E

HWA Racelab (2018–2019)

2018–19 season 

It was confirmed on 15 October 2018 that Vandoorne would drive for HWA Racelab for the 2018–19 Formula E season. He would be joining Britain's Gary Paffett to complete the driver lineup for HWA Racelab. Vandoorne would go on and start his Formula E debut just 3 weeks after leaving Formula 1 and would come 17th in his first race. He has also achieved his first qualifying pole position in Formula E at a wet 2019 Hong Kong ePrix. However, he retired from the race after having a driveshaft issue.He came third in the 2019 Rome ePrix and booked his first podium in Formula E. Vandoorne finished his debut season in 16th position in the driver's standings with 35 points.

Mercedes-EQ Formula E Team (2019–2022)

2019–20 season 
In the 2019–20 season, Vandoorne drove for Mercedes-Benz EQ with 2019 Formula 2 Champion, Nyck de Vries. Vandoorne took 2 consecutive podiums in the two first races. The E-Prix of Mexico and Marrakesh saw a series of poor finishes, and at the time of the season's suspension due to the COVID-19 Pandemic, he sat 29 points below the championship leader, António Félix da Costa. Following the resumption of the season for six races in Berlin, he finished in the points in four of the six races, including his first win in the season finale. He ultimately finished 2nd in the standings, though behind Félix da Costa by 71 points.

2020–21 season 
Vandoorne continued to drive for the renamed Mercedes-EQ Formula E Team for the 2020–21 season, again partnering Nyck de Vries. Vandoorne achieved one win at the second race of 2021 Rome ePrix, and two third place finishes at 2021 Valencia ePrix and 2021 Berlin ePrix. de Vries secured his first Drivers' Championship, as Vandoorne finished ninth in the standings. Vandoorne and de Vries' total points haul allowed Mercedes to achieve their first Teams' Championship that season. Vandoorne and de Vries' partnership will continue for the 2021-22 season.

2021–22 season 
Vandoorne continued to race with the Mercedes-EQ team for the 2021-22 Season in Mercedes' final season in Formula E. With a win in the 2022 Monaco ePrix and seven other podiums, Vandoorne clinched the 2021–22 Formula E World Championship ahead of the New Zealand driver Mitch Evans by 33 points.

DS Penske (2023)

2022–23 season 
In October 2022, it was announced that Vandoorne would be joining the newly formed DS Penske outfit alongside fellow champion Jean-Éric Vergne for the 2023 season.

FIA World Endurance Championship 

In April 2019, it was announced that Stoffel Vandoorne would compete for two races in the WEC for 2018-2019 for SMP Racing. He will drive the Russian BR1 No.11 prototype along with Vitaly Petrov and Mikhail Aleshin in the 6 Hours of Spa-Francorchamps and the 24 Hours of Le Mans. In the 6 Hours of Spa-Francorchamps, Vandoorne, alongside Petrov and Aleshin, finished 3rd place in the LMP1 Class. Vandoorne drove the first stint during weather conditions of snow, hail and rain. At the 24 hour of Le Mans he finished 3rd place.

Vandoorne was set to test the 2023 Peugeot Hypercar at the Bahrain International Circuit during November 2022, but was not able to take part in it after contracting appendicitis. For 2023, Vandoorne was appointed as the reserve driver for the Peugeot Sport in the Hypercar category.

IndyCar Series 
On 17 November 2021, it was announced that Vandoorne will take part in an IndyCar Series test with Arrow McLaren SP at Sebring International Raceway on 6 December 2021.

Racing record

Karting career summary

Racing career summary 

† As Vandoorne was a guest driver he was ineligible to score points.
* Season still in progress.

Complete F4 Eurocup 1.6 results 
(key) (Races in bold indicate pole position) (Races in italics indicate fastest lap)

Complete Eurocup Formula Renault 2.0 results
(key) (Races in bold indicate pole position) (Races in italics indicate fastest lap)

Complete Formula Renault 3.5 Series results 
(key) (Races in bold indicate pole position) (Races in italics indicate fastest lap)

Complete GP2 Series results 
(key) (Races in bold indicate pole position) (Races in italics indicate fastest lap)

Complete Super Formula results 
(key) (Races in bold indicate pole position) (Races in italics indicate fastest lap)

Complete Formula One results 
(key) (Races in bold indicate pole position; races in italics indicate fastest lap)

† Did not finish, but was classified as he had completed more than 90% of the race distance.

Complete Formula E results 
(key) (Races in bold indicate pole position; races in italics indicate fastest lap)

Complete FIA World Endurance Championship results 
(key) (Races in bold indicate pole position; races in italics indicate fastest lap)

Complete 24 Hours of Le Mans results

Complete IMSA SportsCar Championship results 
(key) (Races in bold indicate pole position; races in italics indicate fastest lap)

References

External links 

 
 

1992 births
Living people
Belgian racing drivers
Belgian Formula One drivers
McLaren Formula One drivers
Super Formula drivers
GP2 Series drivers
GP2 Series Champions
World Series Formula V8 3.5 drivers
French F4 Championship drivers
Formula Renault 2.0 NEC drivers
Formula Renault Eurocup drivers
FIA Institute Young Driver Excellence Academy drivers
Sportspeople from Kortrijk
Formula E drivers
24 Hours of Le Mans drivers
FIA World Endurance Championship drivers
Belgian expatriate sportspeople in Monaco
KTR drivers
Josef Kaufmann Racing drivers
Fortec Motorsport drivers
ART Grand Prix drivers
Dandelion Racing drivers
Mercedes-AMG Motorsport drivers
Mercedes-EQ Formula E Team drivers
Jota Sport drivers
Asian Le Mans Series drivers
WeatherTech SportsCar Championship drivers
Auto Sport Academy drivers
SMP Racing drivers
HWA Team drivers
Meyer Shank Racing drivers
Karting World Championship drivers
Formula E Champions